"Under the Influence" is a 1986 song by Canadian singer Vanity. It was released on April 12, 1986 as the lead single from her second album, Skin on Skin. The song peaked at number nine on the Billboard Hot R&B Singles chart and number six on the Hot Dance Club Play chart.

Track listing
US 12" vinyl single

Notes
 "Under the Influence" Remixes - Produced by John Morales and Sergio Munzibai
 "Wild Animal" - Produced by Bill Wolfer and Vanity

Charts

References

 

1986 songs
1986 singles
Vanity (singer) songs
Songs written by Robbie Nevil
Songs written by Tony Haynes
Songs written by Tommy Faragher
Motown singles